Mexican states by population and percentage being indigenous speaking Mexicans.

States

See also
 Languages of Mexico
 Indigenous peoples of Mexico
 Ranked list of Mexican states
 List of Mexican states by HDI

References

Indigenous-speaking

Indigenous-speaking